Tim McCarty is an American football coach and former player. He is the head football coach at Western Heights High School in Oklahoma City. McCarty served two stints as the head football coach at East Central University in Ada, Oklahoma, from 2004 to 2005 and 2009 to 2017. From 1999 to 2003, he was the head football coach at Tabor College in Hillsboro, Kansas. His two tenures at East Central were separated by a three-year stint at the assistant head football coach at Kansas State University.

Playing career
McCarty prepped at Concordia Junior-Senior High School in Concordia, Kansas and is a 1985 graduate of Fort Hays State University. He was a defensive lineman and served as a team captain for the 1983 squad that produced an 8–3 record. McCarty earned a master's of education in administration from Middle Tennessee State University in 1994.

Coaching career
McCarty, a native Kansan, became Kansas State assistant coach on December 8, 2005 and was among head coach Ron Prince's first hires at Kansas State. He held that position from 2006 until 2008.

McCarty came to Kansas State after a two-year stint as the head coach at East Central University in Ada, Oklahoma. While at East Central, McCarty guided the Tigers to a 9–11 record, including a 6–4 finish in his first season in 2004 after being picked to finish last in the Lone Star Conference’s North Division that year.

Prior to East Central, McCarty coached Tabor College to a National Association of Intercollegiate Athletics (NAIA) power from the ground up. In his first season at Tabor in 1999, the Bluejays had just 14 players in the program and struggled through a 0–10 campaign. McCarty guided Tabor to a 3–7 record in 2000, a 5–5 mark in 2001, a 6–4 ledger in 2002 and ultimately a 9–2 record in 2003 that saw the Bluejays achieve a No. 15 national ranking and the program's first berth in the NAIA playoffs.

Personal life
McCarty is married to the former Jillian Bailey of Brentwood, Tennessee. The couple have two daughters.

Head coaching record

College

References

External links
 East Central profile

Year of birth missing (living people)
Living people
American football defensive linemen
Dodge City Conquistadors football coaches
East Central Tigers football coaches
Fort Hays State Tigers football coaches
Fort Hays State Tigers football players
Greenville Panthers football coaches
Kansas Jayhawks football coaches
Kansas State Wildcats football coaches
Middle Tennessee Blue Raiders football coaches
Southwest Baptist Bearcats football coaches
Tabor Bluejays football coaches
High school football coaches in Kansas
High school football coaches in Oklahoma
Middle Tennessee State University alumni
People from Cloud County, Kansas
Coaches of American football from Kansas
Players of American football from Kansas